Bengt Andersson may refer to:

Bengt Andersson (canoeist) (born 1961), Swedish canoeist
Bengt Andersson (footballer, born 1966), Swedish footballer and football coach
Bengt Andersson (sport shooter) (born 1966), Swedish sport shooter
Bengt Andersson (Malmö FF footballer), Swedish footballer for Malmö FF, 1959–60

See also
Bengt Andersson Qvist (1729–1799), Swedish chemist and mineralogist